This is a list of Harlequin Romance novels released in 1950.

Releases

References 

Lists of Harlequin Romance novels
1950 novels